This is a list of notable people who are from Prince Albert, Saskatchewan whether born, raised, or have spent a large part or formative part of their life and or career in that city. Colloquially known as Prince Albertans.

A

B

C

D

E

F

G

H

I

J

K

L

M

N

O

P

Q

R

S

T

U

V

W

X

Y

Z

See also
List of people from Regina, Saskatchewan
List of people from Saskatoon

References

Prince Albert
Prince Albert